The Venada Formation is a geologic formation in Mexico. It preserves fossils dating back to the Carboniferous period.

See also

 List of fossiliferous stratigraphic units in Mexico

References
 

Carboniferous Mexico
Carboniferous southern paleotropical deposits